Tommy Robredo was the defending champion, but lost in the semifinals to Juan Mónaco.

Robin Söderling won in the final 6–3, 7–6(7–4), against Juan Mónaco.

Seeds
The top four seeds receive a bye into the second round.

Draw

Finals

Top half

Bottom half

External links
 Main draw
 Qualifying draw

Swedish Open - Men's Singles
Swedish Open
Swedish